Sinhadevi was a village development committee in Morang District in the Kosi Zone of south-eastern Nepal.It lies in the northern part of Morang district. Singhadevi was incorporated  with a Kerabari, Yangsila, Patigaun & two wards of Bhogteni VDC and has become Kerabari rural municipality.After becoming the part of kerabari rural municipality whole sighadevi VDC has become ward no-2 of Kerabari rural municipality.At the time of the 1991 Nepal census it had a population of 2554 people living in 477 individual households.

References

Kerabari Rural Municipality